Vjalovognathus is an extinct genus of conodonts.

Vjalovognathus nicolli is a species from the Early Permian of the Xiala Formation in China.
Vjalovognathus carinatus is from the late Permian of the Selong Formation in South Tibet, China, which is believed to be the youngest species of Vjalovognathus

References

External links 

Conodont genera
Permian conodonts